Krivoklát is a village and municipality in Ilava District in the Trenčín Region of north-western Slovakia.

History
In historical records the village was first mentioned in 1439.

Geography
The municipality lies at an altitude of 252 metres and covers an area of 10.668 km2. It has a population of about 288 people.

References

External links

https://web.archive.org/web/20070427022352/http://www.statistics.sk/mosmis/eng/run.html 

Villages and municipalities in Ilava District